Sain Qaleh (also Romanized as Şā’īn Qal‘eh; also known as Sain-Kalekh and Khorosan) is a city in the Central District of Abhar County, Zanjan province, Iran. At the 2006 census, its population was 11,083 in 2,896 households. The following census in 2011 counted 11,939 people in 3,470 households. The latest census in 2016 showed a population of 12,989 people in 4,048 households.

The 14th-century author Hamdallah Mustawfi mentioned Sa'in Qal'eh in his Nuzhat al-Qulub: he referred to "the village called Quhūd, which the Mongols call Sāin Qal'ah, and which is the chief of all those neighboring hamlets". He also wrote that it was close to the castle of Sarjahan.

Notable people 
 Ibrahim al-Musawi al-Zanjani  (1925 –  1999), Islamic scholar and writer.

References 

Abhar County

Cities in Zanjan Province

Populated places in Zanjan Province

Populated places in Abhar County